Kona Venkat ( born 19 February 1965) is an Indian screenwriter and producer known for his works in Telugu and Hindi cinema.
He is known for his works in box office hits such as Alludu Seenu, Amma Nanna O Tamila Ammayi Baadshah, Dookudu, Adhurs, Ready, Dhee, Venky, Geethanjali, Happy, Samba, Ninnu Kori and Jai Lava Kusa and has recently completed 50 films and 20 years in the film industry.

Selected filmography

As a writer
He started his journey in the film industry in 1997, and, before making his debut as a full-fledged screenwriter in 2003, he has worked as a "telugu dubbing" writer for Hindi films such as Satya, Dil Se.., Kaun, Mast, Jungle, Company, etc.

As producer
He established the production company Kona Film Corporation and produced several movies.
Gully Rowdy (2021)
Nishabdham (2020)
Neevevaro (2018)
Ninnu Kori (2017)
Sahasam Swasaga Sagipo (2016)
Abhinetri (2016)
Shankarabharanam (2015)
Geethanjali (2014)
Thoka Leni Pitta (1997)

As actor
 Endukante... Premanta!

As director
His debut directional film was shelved and unreleased because of unknown reasons.
 Naan Aval Adhu / Nenu Tanu Aame (2008)

Awards
Santosham Film Awards: Best Writer(2008) for the movie Ready''

References

External links
 

1965 births
Indian male screenwriters
Living people
Telugu screenwriters
Screenwriters from Andhra Pradesh
People from Guntur district
Telugu film producers
21st-century Indian dramatists and playwrights
Film producers from Andhra Pradesh
Male actors from Andhra Pradesh
Telugu film directors
Male actors in Telugu cinema
21st-century Indian male writers
21st-century Indian screenwriters